Vaina is a surname of several origins. 

It may be a Lithuanian-language surname and a given name. As a given name, it is a diminutive for Vainoras or Vainora (which can also be surnames). The  corresponding Polish-language surnames are Wojna nd Woyna.

Notable people with the surname include:
Abraomas Vaina (1569-1649), Roman Catholic priest and auxiliary bishop of Vilnius, bishop of Samogitia (1626–1631), and  bishop of Vilnius
 (?-1747), a dignitary of Grand Duchy of Lithuania, notarius magnus Lithuaniae
 (?-1615)   bishop of Vilnius
 (?-1500), statesman in Grand Duchy of Lithuania; held various high positions, including Treasurer of the Lithuanian Court and Treasurer of the Lithuanian Lands
Vladimír Vaina (1909-1996), Czech rower

See also

References

Lithuanian-language surnames